In number theory, a Wolstenholme prime is a special type of prime number satisfying a stronger version of Wolstenholme's theorem. Wolstenholme's theorem is a congruence relation satisfied by all prime numbers greater than 3. Wolstenholme primes are named after mathematician Joseph Wolstenholme, who first described this theorem in the 19th century.

Interest in these primes first arose due to their connection with Fermat's Last Theorem. Wolstenholme primes are also related to other special classes of numbers, studied in the hope to be able to generalize a proof for the truth of the theorem to all positive integers greater than two.

The only two known Wolstenholme primes are 16843 and 2124679 . There are no other Wolstenholme primes less than 109.

Definition

Wolstenholme prime can be defined in a number of equivalent ways.

Definition via binomial coefficients
A Wolstenholme prime is a prime number p > 7 that satisfies the congruence

where the expression in left-hand side denotes a binomial coefficient.
In comparison, Wolstenholme's theorem states that for every prime p > 3 the following congruence holds:

Definition via Bernoulli numbers
A Wolstenholme prime is a prime p that divides the numerator of the Bernoulli number Bp−3. The Wolstenholme primes therefore form a subset of the irregular primes.

Definition via irregular pairs

A Wolstenholme prime is a prime p such that (p, p–3) is an irregular pair.

Definition via harmonic numbers
A Wolstenholme prime is a prime p such that

i.e. the numerator of the harmonic number  expressed in lowest terms is divisible by p3.

Search and current status
The search for Wolstenholme primes began in the 1960s and continued over the following decades, with the latest results published in 2007. The first Wolstenholme prime 16843 was found in 1964, although it was not explicitly reported at that time. The 1964 discovery was later independently confirmed in the 1970s. This remained the only known example of such a prime for almost 20 years, until the discovery announcement of the second Wolstenholme prime 2124679 in 1993. Up to 1.2, no further Wolstenholme primes were found. This was later extended to 2 by McIntosh in 1995  and Trevisan & Weber were able to reach 2.5.

Expected number of Wolstenholme primes
It is conjectured that infinitely many Wolstenholme primes exist. It is conjectured that the number of Wolstenholme primes ≤ x is about ln ln x, where ln denotes the natural logarithm. For each prime p ≥ 5, the Wolstenholme quotient is defined as
 
Clearly, p is a Wolstenholme prime if and only if Wp ≡ 0 (mod p). Empirically one may assume that the remainders of Wp modulo p are uniformly distributed in the set {0, 1, ..., p–1}. By this reasoning, the probability that the remainder takes on a particular value (e.g., 0) is about 1/p.

See also
 Wieferich prime
 Wall–Sun–Sun prime
 Wilson prime
 Table of congruences

Notes

References

Further reading

External links
 Caldwell, Chris K. Wolstenholme prime from The Prime Glossary
 McIntosh, R. J. Wolstenholme Search Status as of March 2004 e-mail to Paul Zimmermann
 Bruck, R. Wolstenholme's Theorem, Stirling Numbers, and Binomial Coefficients
 Conrad, K. The p-adic Growth of Harmonic Sums interesting observation involving the two Wolstenholme primes

Classes of prime numbers
Unsolved problems in number theory